The Rite of Spring is a 2022 Spanish drama film with comedy elements directed by Fernando Franco which stars Valèria Sorolla, Telmo Irureta, and Emma Suárez.

Plot 
Delving into the topic of sexual repression (and awakening), the plot tracks Laura, a young woman from a conservative background moving to a colegio mayor in Madrid to study a degree in Chemistry. She meets David, a boy with cerebral palsy living with his mother Isabel. Laura establishes a friendly relationship with Isabel and David and accepts to masturbate David in their home in exchange for money.

Cast

Cast 
The screenplay was penned by Franco alongside Begoña Arostegui. Shooting locations included Granada and Madrid.

Release 
Selected for the 70th San Sebastián International Film Festival's official selection, the film was presented on 21 September 2022. Distributed by La Aventura, it was theatrically released on 30 September 2022.

Reception 
Carlos Loureda of Fotogramas considered that Franco surpasses himself in his "his most amiable and open film" in what seemed unbeatable so far: the direction of actresses. Also reviewing for Fotogramas, Pablo Vázquez scored 5 out of 5 stars, describing the film as "a beautiful act of artistic terrorism, as virtuous and warm as it is absurdly human".

Jonathan Holland of ScreenDaily deemed the film to be "daring", "undoubtedly crafted with care" and "Franco's most accessible work to date", while pointing out at the script's lack of "imaginative power", being "far more interested in presenting interactions in exquisite detail than it is in putting flesh on the characters involved".

Javier Ocaña of Cinemanía rated the film 4 out of 5 stars considering that newcomers Sorolla and Irureta manage to move viewers with their frank performances.

Manuel J. Lombardo of Diario de Sevilla rated the film 4 out of 5 stars, deeming it to be a "film full of nuances" that "breathes truth and exhales emotions as sober as they are authentic".

Top ten lists 
The film appeared on a number of critics' top ten lists of the best Spanish films of 2022:

Accolades 

|-
| align = "center" | 2022 || 28th Forqué Awards || colspan = "2" | Cinema and Education in Values ||  || 
|-
| rowspan = "11" align = "center" | 2023
| rowspan = "2" | 10th Feroz Awards || Best Supporting Actress in a Film || Emma Suárez ||  || rowspan = "2" | 
|-
| Best Film Poster || Mica Murphy || 
|-
| rowspan = "6" | 2nd Carmen Awards || colspan = "2" | Best Film ||  || rowspan = "6" | 
|-
| Best Director || Fernando Franco || 
|-
| Best Original Screenplay || Fernando Franco, Begoña Arostegui || 
|-
| Best Costume Design || Esther Vaquero || 
|-
| Best Sound || Dani de Zayas || 
|-
| Best Makeup and Hairstyles || María Liaño, Rafael Mora || 
|-
| rowspan = "2" | 37th Goya Awards || Best New Actress || Valèria Sorolla ||  || rowspan = "2" | 
|-
| Best New Actor || Telmo Irureta || 
|-
| 31st Actors and Actresses Union Awards || Best Film Actress in a Minor Role || Emma Suárez ||  || 
|}

See also 
 List of Spanish films of 2022

References 

Spanish drama films
Films shot in Madrid
Films shot in the province of Granada
Films set in Madrid
Films about sexual repression
2020s Spanish films
2020s Spanish-language films
2022 drama films
2022 films
Spanish coming-of-age drama films